Harold Thomas Cothliff (24 March 1916 – 1976) was an English professional footballer who played in the Football League for Torquay United as a right half.

References 

English footballers

Clapton Orient F.C. wartime guest players
English Football League players
1916 births
1976 deaths
Footballers from Liverpool
Association football wing halves
Prescot Cables F.C. players
Manchester City F.C. players
Nottingham Forest F.C. players
Torquay United F.C. players
Dartmouth A.F.C. players
Ilfracombe Town F.C. players
Portsmouth F.C. wartime guest players
Brighton & Hove Albion F.C. wartime guest players
Fulham F.C. wartime guest players
Chelsea F.C. wartime guest players
AFC Bournemouth wartime guest players
Millwall F.C. wartime guest players
English emigrants to New Zealand